Laksamana mengamuk (lit. "raging admiral") (Jawi: لقسامان مڠماوق) is a typical drink from Riau, Indonesia. This drink is made from mango mixed with coconut milk and sugar. Usually served during Ramadan.

See also

Cuisine of Indonesia
List of Indonesian desserts
List of Indonesian dishes
List of Indonesian snacks
Malay cuisine

References

Cold drinks
Indonesian drinks
Malay cuisine